Battersea Power Station Pier is a Thames Clippers commuter service pier, located on the River Thames at Battersea Power Station. The pier provides interchange with Battersea Power Station tube station.

Location
The pier is located on the south bank of the River Thames at Battersea Power Station. It provides interchange with Battersea Power Station tube station on the London Underground.

Services
It is served by routes RB1, RB2 and RB6. It is located in the Central Zone.

References

External links
Battersea Power Station Pier - Transport for London
Battersea Power Station Pier - Uber Boat by Thames Clippers

London River Services
Transport in the London Borough of Wandsworth
Piers in London